The Gibraltar Open is a darts tournament, first held in 1967 and annually since 2004.

Results

Men

Women

Youth

References 
 https://dartswdf.com/competitions/gibraltar-open-men/2021/results
 https://mastercaller.com/tournaments/gibraltar-open-men

External links
 https://dartswdf.com/tournaments/gibraltar-open
 Gibraltar Open

Darts tournaments
Sports competitions in Gibraltar
1967 establishments in Gibraltar